() was a senior Byzantine honorific dignity in use from the late 10th to early 12th centuries.

The term  means 'master of the ', another group of high court dignitaries.

It is first mentioned in the Escorial Taktikon, a list of offices and court titles and their precedence compiled in the 970s. Initially, it was restricted to senior court eunuchs, but came to be awarded to senior officers as well after the mid-11th century. Its holders included famed generals such as Michael Bourtzes, Nikephoros Melissenos, and possibly also the future Byzantine emperors Nikephoros Botaneiates and Romanos Diogenes, but also some senior judicial officials of Constantinople. Both titles are in evidence in the early 12th century, but apparently fell completely out of use soon after.

References

Sources

 

Byzantine court titles